"" (So take my hands now) is a Christian hymn often sung at funerals. The text by Julie Hausmann was first printed in 1862. The melody by Friedrich Silcher appeared already in 1843 with a different text. The song is well-known beyond churchgoers. It was translated into English as "Take Thou my hand, o Father", and into many other languages.

History 
Julie Hausmann, a Baltic German, was influenced by Pietism. Lieder einer Stillen im Lande (May Flowers. Song by a Quiet Country Woman.) in 1862. The term "Die Stillen im Lande" was often applied to Pietists in general, but was also appropriate for the reticent and withdrawn woman.

The exact date and reasons for "So nimm denn meine Hände" are not known. The poetry expresses faith in the guidance by an addressed "You". The Biblical header, "Ich will Dir folgen, wo Du hingehst" (I will follow you wherever you go) identifies the You as Jesus. This quotes a follower of Jesus, who promises to follow unconditionally. Another Biblical reference may be the story of Martha and Mary), with Mary listening to Jesus in a position at his feet as the fourth stanza describes. Legend has it that Hausmann wanted to marry a missionary in Africa, but found him dead when she arrived.

In the first publication, the poem has six stanzas of four lines each, with the final stanza repeating the first as an affirmation. The rhyme scheme fit no traditional hymn tune. Friedrich Silcher wrote a melody published 1843 a collection Zwölf Kinderlieder für Schule und Haus, zwei- drei- und vierstimmig componiert (Twelve children's songs for school and home, composed for two, three and four parts). It was combined with the text "Wie könnt ich ruhig schlafen in dunkler Nacht, wenn ich, o Gott und Vater, nicht dein gedacht?" (How could a sleep peacefully in dark night if I had not thought of you, o God and Father), an evening prayer for children by Agnes Franz. It is not known when Hausmann's text was combined with Silcher's melody. In 1870 at least both were firmly together, now as three stanzas of eight lines each due to the longer melody.

While the song soon became popular, it was included in official hymnals only with hesitation. The  of 1915 and its regional versions included it as a "Geistliches Volkslied", a sacred Volkslied or popular song which was not intended for use in church services. It was not included in the general part (Stammteil) of the 1950 Evangelisches Kirchengesangbuch (EKG). In the 1980s, Protestants who were requested to name a sacred song they knew mentioned "So nimm denn meine Hände" as No. 3, after "Ein feste Burg" and "Lobe den Herren". The 1993 Evangelisches Gesangbuch then lists it as a hymn (EG 376) in the section Glaube – Liebe – Hoffnung: Angst und Vertrauen (Faith – Love – Hope: Anxiety and Trust), not under Sterben und ewiges Leben (Death and eternal life). In the regional section of the Catholic hymnal Gotteslob of the Diocese of Hamburg it is listed as GL 851 under Vertrauen und Trost (Trust and Consolation).

In a 2019 survey in Germany, "So nimm denn meine Hände" was named No. 7 of musical pieces suitable for memorial services, following Frank Sinatra's "My Way" as No. 6.

Translations 
The song was translated into several languages. An early translation into English was made by Herman H. Brueckner as "Take Thou my hand, o Father". Elmer Leon Jorgenson translated it to "Take Thou My Hand, and Lead Me", published in  Great Songs of the Church in 1921. In subsequent editions of the hymnal, the song changes number, but it was omitted in the 1937 "Number Two" edition, which was reissued in 1974. The hymn has also been translated by Martha D. Lange, whose version appears in Great Songs of the Church Revised in 1986.

It was also translated into French, Italian, Dutch, Swedish and Czech ("Ó ujmi ruku moji" by Josef Baštecký in 1871), among others.

References

Cited sources

Further reading 
 Karl Röhrig: Die ursprüngliche Textgestalt von "So nimm denn meine Hände". In: Monatsschrift für Gottesdienst und kirchliche Kunst 30 (1925), H. 4/5, pp. 115–117.
 Waldtraut Ingeborg Sauer-Geppert: So nimm denn meine Hände. In: Jahrbuch für Liturgik und Hymnologie. year 27 (1983), pp. 207–217.

External links 

 
 So nimm denn meine Hände (music) sermon-online.com
 So nimm denn meine Hände (text, audio, song books, in German)

19th-century hymns in German
1862 songs